Luc P. Devroye is a Belgian computer scientist and mathematician and a James McGill Professor in the School of Computer Science of McGill University in Montreal, Quebec, Canada.

Devroye specializes in the probabilistic analysis of algorithms, random number generation, and type design.

Education
He studied at Katholieke Universiteit Leuven and subsequently at Osaka University and in 1976 received his PhD from University of Texas at Austin under the supervision of Terry Wagner.

Career
Since joining the McGill faculty in 1977 he has won an E.W.R. Steacie Memorial Fellowship (1987), a Humboldt Research Award (2004), the Killam Prize (2005) and the Statistical Society of Canada gold medal (2008). He received an honorary doctorate from the University of Louvain (UCLouvain) in 2002, and he received an honorary doctorate from University of Antwerp on March 29, 2012.

Awards
Flajolet Lecture Prize, 2018

References

External links
 Luc Devroye's Homepage
 The Mathematician Typographer

Year of birth missing (living people)
Living people
Belgian computer scientists
Academic staff of McGill University
Anglophone Quebec people